Gihan Rathnayake (born 14 February 2001) is a Sri Lankan cricketer. He made his List A debut on 9 March 2019, for Badureliya Sports Club in the 2018–19 Premier Limited Overs Tournament. He made his Twenty20 debut on 4 March 2021, for Badureliya Sports Club in the 2020–21 SLC Twenty20 Tournament.

References

External links
 

2001 births
Living people
Sri Lankan cricketers
Badureliya Sports Club cricketers
Place of birth missing (living people)